"Deadcrush" is a song by British indie rock band alt-J. It is the fifth track and fourth single from their third studio album, Relaxer, and was released as a digital single on 12 July 2017 by Infectious Music and Atlantic Records. The song was written by Joe Newman, Gus Unger-Hamiltion, and Thom Sonny Green and produced by Charlie Andrew. The song's title is based on a game the band played where they asked the question, "What historical figure would I want to take on a date if she were alive today?", and so the name "Deadcrush" is based on someone's "dead crush". It features vocals from Ellie Rowsell of Wolf Alice. The song was also featured in the soundtrack for FIFA 18.

Composition and lyrics
In an interview with NPR, the band said:

Music video
A music video for the song was released on 12 July 2017. It was directed by Young Replicant, who also directed the music video for "3WW". It features the band's "dead crushes": Sylvia Plath, Lee Miller, and Anne Boleyn teaming up in a post-apocalyptic world.

Official video
The choreography was designed by Darcy Wallace, performed by Leah Marojević, Alana Everett and Natalia Iwaniec.

Live performances
The band performed "Deadcrush" at the 2017 Mercury Prize ceremony at the Eventim Apollo in London on 14 September 2017. Relaxer was shortlisted for the prize.

Track listing

Personnel
Credits adapted from Tidal

alt-J
Joe Newman – guitar, vocals
Gus Unger-Hamilton – keyboards, vocals
Thom Sonny Green – drums, percussion, programming

Additional musicians
London Metropolitan Orchestra – strings
Ellie Rowsell – vocals

Technical
Charlie Andrew – production, mixing, engineering, programming
Brett Cox – engineering
Jay Pocknell - engineering
Stefano Civetta – assistant engineering
Paul Pritchard – assistant engineering
Graeme Baldwin – assistant engineering
Dick Beetham – mastering

Artwork and design
Osamu Sato

Charts

Certifications

Deadcrushed

Four remixes of "Deadcrush", by Spike Stent, Ben de Vries, Lea Porcelain, and Salute, were individually released by alt-J as digital singles in August 2017. A collection of the remix singles, excluding the remix by Spike Stent, was released as an EP on 27 September 2017 with additional remixes by Damian Lazarus, Otzeki, Miro Shot, and Vesica.

References

2017 singles
Alt-J songs
2017 songs
Infectious Music singles
Atlantic Records singles
Songs written by Thom Sonny Green